Lexington is a suburban town in Middlesex County, Massachusetts, United States, located 10 miles (16 km) from Downtown Boston. The population was 34,454 as of the 2020 census.  The area was originally inhabited by Native Americans, and was first settled by Europeans in 1641 as a farming community. Lexington is well known as the site of the first shots of the American Revolutionary War, in the Battle of Lexington on April 19, 1775, where the "Shot heard 'round the world" took place. It is home to Minute Man National Historical Park.

History

Indigenous history 
Native Americans inhabited the area that would become Lexington for thousands of years prior to European colonization of the Americas, as attested by a woodland era archaeological site near Loring Hill south of the town center. At the time of European contact, the area may have been a border region between Naumkeag or Pawtucket to the northeast, Massachusett to the south, and Nipmuc to the west, though the land was eventually purchased from the Naumkeag. The contact period introduced a number of European infectious diseases which would decimate native populations in virgin soil epidemics, leaving the area largely uncontested upon the arrival of large groups of English settlers in the Puritan Great Migration. In 1639, the Massachusetts General Court purchased the land that would become present day Lexington, then within the boundaries of Cambridge, from the Naumkeag Squaw Sachem of Mistick.

Colonial history 
The area that is now Lexington was first settled circa 1642 as part of Cambridge, Massachusetts. As the population increased, Lexington was incorporated as a separate parish, called Cambridge Farms, in 1691. This allowed the residents to have their own local church and minister, although they were still under jurisdiction of the Town of Cambridge. Lexington was incorporated as a separate town in 1713. It was then that it got the name Lexington. How the town received its name is the subject of some controversy. One view is that it was named in honor of Lord Lexington, an English peer. Another view is that it was named after Lexington (which was pronounced and is today spelled Laxton) in Nottinghamshire, England.

In the early colonial days, Vine Brook, which runs through Lexington, Burlington, and Bedford, and then empties into the Shawsheen River, was a focal point of the farming and industry of the town. It provided for many types of mills, and in the 20th Century, for farm irrigation.

Battle of Lexington 

On April 19, 1775, what many regard as the first battle of the American Revolutionary War, the Battle at Lexington, took place. On the night of April 18, the British Army sent out 800 grenadiers and light infantry soldiers on foot from Boston, with the intention of destroying Colonial gunpowder and cannons that were being stored in Concord, as well as capturing two leaders of the Sons of Liberty, John Hancock and Samuel Adams, who were staying in Lexington. Hancock and Adams were warned of the danger by two alarm riders, Paul Revere and William Dawes, who alerted the countryside of the British military movements with shouts of “the Redcoats are coming!” When the British soldiers arrived on the Lexington Common not long after sunrise, they faced 77 men of the Lexington militia, commanded by Captain John Parker. Someone — still unknown to this day — fired a shot, provoking an exchange of musket fire between the two sides. Eight Lexington militia men were killed, dozens more wounded. After the rout, the British marched on toward Concord.  There, several hundred militia and minute men from nearby towns assembled near the Old North Bridge to turn back the British and prevent them from capturing and destroying the Colony's stores of gunpowder and military equipment.

Today, the town annually commemorates the battle on the Battle Green in the Downtown with a reenactment, as part of its Patriots Day festivities.

Urbanization 

For decades after the Revolutionary War, Lexington grew modestly while remaining largely a farming community, providing Boston with much of its produce. Many of these farms became dense housing developments and subdivisions by the 1970s. One notable housing development was the Peacock Farm residential neighborhood. It was designed by architect Walter Pierce and was built between 1952 and 1958. As of 2012, the neighborhood was on the National Register of Historic Places. Lexington always had a bustling downtown area, which remains to this day. Lexington began to prosper, helped by its proximity to Boston, and having a rail line (originally the Lexington and West Cambridge Railroad, later the Boston and Maine Railroad) service its citizens and businesses, beginning in 1846 until 1981. In 1984, Due to the rapid urbanization that occurred in many other suburbs like Lexington, The MBTA proposed expanding the Red Line through Lexington, terminating in Bedford. Despite Lexington and Bedford being on board with the idea, Arlington residents lobbied against the plan and it was shot down by the Board of Selectmen.

Lexington, as well as many of the towns along the Route 128 corridor, experienced a jump in population in the 1960s and 1970s, due to the high-tech boom. Today, many companies are still moving into Lexington, with Takeda and BAE Systems both having major operations within the city limits. The urbanization and massive job growth resulted in soaring property values, and the school system becoming nationally recognized for its excellence. The town participates in the METCO program, which buses minority students from Boston to suburban towns to receive better educational opportunities than those available to them in the Boston Public Schools.

Lexington was the Cold War location of the USAF "Experimental SAGE Subsector" for testing a prototype IBM computer that arrived in July 1955 for development of a computerized "national air defense network" (the namesake "Lexington Discrimination System" for incoming ICBM warheads was developed in the late 1960s).

Geography

Lexington is located at  (42.444345, −71.226928).

According to the United States Census Bureau, the town has a total area of 16.5 square miles (42.8 km2), of which 16.4 square miles (42.5 km2) is land and 0.1 square miles (0.4 km2), or 0.85%, is water.

Lexington is bordered by Burlington, Woburn, Winchester, Arlington, Belmont, Waltham, Lincoln, and Bedford. It has more area than all other municipalities that it borders.

Demographics

As of the census of 2010, there had been 31,394 people, 11,530 households, and 8,807 families residing in the town. The racial makeup of the town was 68.6% White, 25.4% Asian (15.4% Chinese, 4.8% Asian Indian, 3.2% Korean), 1.5% Black or African American, 0.1% Native American, 0.0% Pacific Islander, 0.5% from other races, and 2.6% from two or more races. Hispanic or Latino of any race were 2.3% of the population.

There were 11,530 households, out of which 38.6% had children under the age of 18 living with them, 66.0% were married couples living together, 7.7% had a female householder with no husband present, and 24.1% were non-families. Of all households, 20.8% were made up of individuals, and 12.3% had someone living alone who was 65 years of age or older. The average household size was 2.66 and the average family size was 3.10.

In the town, the population was spread out, with 26.4% under the age of 18, 3.5% from 18 to 24, 22.7% from 25 to 44, 28.5% from 45 to 64, and 19.0% who were 65 years of age or older. The median age was 44 years. For every 100 females, there were 88.7 males. For every 100 females age 18 and over, there were 83.5 males.

In 2018, the mean home price was $910,584, and the median price of a house was $1,050,821. According to a 2018 estimate, the median income for a household in the town was $191,350, and the median income for a family was $218,890. Males had a median income of $101,334 versus $77,923 for females. The per capita income for the town was $70,132. About 1.8% of families and 3.4% of the population were below the poverty line, including 3.2% of those under age 18 and 3.4% of those age 65 or over.

By race, the median household income was highest for mixed race households, at $263,321. Hispanic households had a median income of $233,875. Asian households had a median income of $178,988. White households had a median income of $154,533. Black households had a median income of $139,398. American Indian or Alaskan Native households had a median income of $125,139.

Immigrant population 
As of 2020, Lexington has the highest Asian population in Massachusetts, reflecting 36% of the population. 29% of Lexington residents were born outside of the United States. This racial diversity is largely reflected in the Lexington Public Schools, where Asians compose over 40% of the student population.

Transportation
MBTA bus operates three routes that connect with the Red Line at Alewife station in Cambridge.

Government and politics 
The town uses a five-member Select Board. The day-to-day operations are handled by a Town Manager hired by the Select Board. A Representative town meeting, acts as the legislative body, made up of 203 members, including 21 citizens elected from each of nine precincts for three-year staggered terms, and it meets at least once a year. At-large member positions include the Select Board, Town Counsel, Town Clerk and the School Committee chairman. Article LXXXIX Section 8 of the Massachusetts Constitution permits towns with a population greater than 12,000 to adopt a city form of government. The Town of Lexington meets the population requirement to become a city, but has not done so, in part because it would lose its ability to engage citizens in local government under the Representative Town Meeting form of government.

Lexington is Represented by State Representative Michelle Ciccolo, State Senators Cindy Friedman and Michael Barrett, all Democrats. Lexington is in Massachusetts's 5th congressional district, currently represented by Katherine Clark. Federally, Lexington is heavily Democratic, having not voted Republican since 1980. Even in Scott Brown's upset 2010 Senate special election, he received just 34% of the vote, to Coakley's 64%.

Emergency services

Law enforcement
The Lexington Police Department (LPD) is responsible for law enforcement in the town of Lexington, handling investigations, patrol, and traffic safety/control, with 51 sworn officers. They also host a youth academy for children aged 12–17 as well as a Police Explorers Program (For high school students interested in the comprehensive learning of Law Enforcement). It is led by Chief of Police Michael McLean.

Fire and rescue
The Lexington Fire Department (LFD) provides both fire and rescue, and emergency medical services to the town of Lexington. The date of its formation is unknown. It is based in the Fire Department Headquarters, with a secondary East Lexington Station, having 61 firefighters and EMS personnel. It is led by Fire Chief Derek Sencabaugh.

Education

Public schools

Lexington's public education system includes six elementary schools, two middle schools, and one high school. Overall the Lexington school district is among the top ranked in the state and nationally. Bridge Elementary School, Jonas Clarke Middle School, and Harrington Elementary School  were High Performing National Blue Ribbon Schools in 2010, 2013, and 2019 respectively. They have been ranked as top schools based on Massachusetts Comprehensive Assessment System (MCAS) test scores. Lexington High School was ranked in 2014 as the 19th best high school in the nation by U.S. News. In 2012, 2017, and 2018, Lexington High School won the U.S. Department of Energy (DOE) National Science Bowl competition. In addition to Lexington High School, students may attend Minuteman Regional High School. In 2019 Jonas Clarke Middle School won the National Science Bowl competition.

Elementary Schools
Joseph Estabrook Elementary School
Fiske Elementary School
Maria Hastings Elementary School
Bridge Elementary School
Bowman Elementary School
Harrington Elementary School

Middle Schools
William Diamond Middle School
Jonas Clarke Middle School

High Schools
Lexington High School
Minuteman Regional High School

Private schools
 Lexington Christian Academy
 Lexington Montessori School
 The Waldorf School of Lexington

Supplementary education
The Lexington Chinese School (LCS; 勒星頓中文學校) holds its classes at Belmont High School in Belmont. In 2003 over 400 students attended classes at LCS, held on Sundays.
Shishu Bharati School of Languages and Culture of India

Culture and art

Music
Lexington is home to the Lexington Symphony, which performs regularly at Cary Hall.

Economy
Major employers in Lexington include Takeda (formerly Shire), BAE Systems, MIT Lincoln Laboratory, Stride Rite, Agilent, Global Insight, CareOne, the Cotting School, Ipswitch, and Lexington Public Schools.

Points of interest

Lexington is most well known for its history and is home to many historical buildings, parks, and monuments, most dating from Colonial and Revolutionary times.
One of the most prominent historical landmarks, located in Lexington Centre, is the Lexington Common, commonly known as the Lexington Battle Green, and known by locals as the Battle Green or the Green. The Lexington Battle Green is known for being the site of the Battle of Lexington, where the "shot heard round the world" was fired. A statue of the captain of the Lexington Militia, John Parker, stands on the Battle Green. The statue is known as the Minuteman Statue by locals. A historical reenactment of the Battle of Lexington takes place on the Battle Green every year on Patriots' Day as part of the Patriots' Day celebrations. 
Another important historical monument is the Revolutionary Monument, the nation's oldest standing war memorial (completed on July 4, 1799) and the gravesite of those colonists slain in the Battle of Lexington.
Other landmarks of historical importance include the Old Burying Ground (with gravestones dating back to 1690), the Old Belfry, Buckman Tavern (–1710), Munroe Tavern, the Hancock-Clarke House (1737), the U.S.S. Lexington Memorial, the Centre Depot (old Boston and Maine train station, today the headquarters of the town Historical Society), Follen Church (the oldest standing church building in Lexington, built in 1839), and the Mulliken White Oak (one of Lexington's most distinguished and oldest trees).
Lexington is also home, along with neighboring Lincoln and nearby Concord to the  Minute Man National Historical Park.
The Scottish Rite Masonic Museum & Library showcases exhibits on American history and Freemasonry.
Lexington's town center is home to numerous dining opportunities, fine art galleries, retail shopping, a small cinema, the Cary Memorial Library, the Minuteman Bikeway, Depot Square, and many of the aforementioned historical landmarks.
The Great Meadow, a.k.a. Arlington's Great Meadows, is a sprawling meadow and marshland located in East Lexington, but owned by the town of Arlington, Lexington's neighbor to the east.
Willards Woods Conservation Area, a small forest of conservation land donated years ago by the Willard Sisters. Willards Woods is referenced in the classic Saturday Night Live skit "Donnie's Party".
Wilson Farm, a farm and farm stand in operation since 1884.
The Lexington Community Center is a meeting place for Lexington residents.
Notable Lexington neighborhoods include Lexington Centre, Meriam Hill (and Granny Hill), Irish Village, Loring Hill, Belfry Hill, Munroe Hill, Countryside (sometimes referred to as "Scotland"), the Munroe District, the Manor Section, Four Corners, Grapevine Corner, Woodhaven, Liberty Heights and East Lexington (fondly "East Village", or "The East End").
Marrett Square, at the intersection of Marrett Road and Waltham Street, is the location of some light shopping and dining.
The "Old Reservoir," sometimes referred to by locals as "The Res," used to provide drinking water to Lexington residents and surrounding areas. Now it offers a place to swim and picnic in the summer time. In the winter, when it freezes over, it is used as an ice skating area.
Book publisher D.C. Heath was founded in 1885 at 125 Spring Street in Lexington, near the present day intersection of Route 128 and MA Route 2, and was headquartered on that spot until its 1995 sale to Houghton Mifflin.
Lexington is home to several historically significant modernist communities built by notable architects. These neighborhoods include Six Moon Hill, Peacock Farm, Five Fields, and Turning Mill/Middle Ridge.

Notable people

Sister cities
Lexington is a sister city of:
 Antony, France
 Dolores Hidalgo, Guanajuato, Mexico
 Waspam, Nicaragua
 Pavlovsk, Russia
 Gatchina, Russia

References

Further reading
 1871 Atlas of Massachusetts. by Wall & Gray.Map of Massachusetts. Map of Middlesex County.
 History of Middlesex County, Massachusetts, Volume 1 (A-H), Volume 2 (L-W) compiled by Samuel Adams Drake, published 1879 and 1880. 572 and 505 pages. Lexington section by Charles Hudson in volume 2 pages 9–33 (note page 9 missing).
 History of the Town of Lexington, Middlesex County, Massachusetts,Volume 1 - History, Volume2 - Genealogies, by Charles Hudson, published 1913.
 Paul Revere's Ride, by David Hackett Fischer, Oxford University Press, New York, NY, 1994. .

External links

 Town of Lexington official website
 Lexington Historical Society
 
 
 

 
1642 establishments in Massachusetts
Populated places established in 1642
Towns in Massachusetts
Towns in Middlesex County, Massachusetts